The Infinite Desire is an album by jazz guitarist Al Di Meola that was released in 1998. Pianist Herbie Hancock plays acoustic piano on one pice, guitarist Steve Vai also plays electric guitar on another. Other guests include Pino Daniele on vocals, Mario Parmisano on keyboards, piano and strings and Rachel Z also on keyboards.

Track listing
All songs by Al Di Meola unless otherwise noted.
 "Beyond the Mirage" – 7:18
 "Shaking the Spirits" – 6:30
 "Vizzini" – 4:54
 "In My Mother's Eyes (Memory of Theresa)" – 4:41
 "The Infinite Desire" (Al Di Meola, Pino Daniele) – 5:26
 "Invention of the Monsters" – 3:06
 "Istanbul" – 8:00
 "Azzura" – 2:55
 "Big Sky Azzura" – 6:07
 "Race with Devil on Turkish Highway" –  4:03
 "Valentina" – 4:44
 "The Infinite Desire (Vocal)" (Di Meola, Daniele) – 5:27

Personnel
 Al Di Meola – acoustic guitar (1-5, 7, 10-12), electric guitar (1, 3, 6, 7, 9, 10, 11), bass guitar (11), 10 string Harp (7), steel guitar (8), classical guitar (8), synthesizer (2, 8, 11), cymbals (2, 3, 12), finger cymbals (7), marimba (3), percussion (2, 7, 9, 12) 
 Steve Vai – electric guitar (10) 
 John Patitucci – electric bass guitar (1)
 Herbie Hancock – acoustic piano solo (7)
 Mario Parmisano – keyboards (6, 8, 9), piano (6, 8, 9), strings (1)
 Rachel Z – keyboards (11)
 Gumbi Ortiz – congas (7) 
 Kabuli Nitasa – violin, vocals (1)
 Oriana Di Meola – vocals (2) 
 Layla Francesca – vocals (2) 
 Pino Daniele – vocals (12)

Chart performance

References

Jazz fusion albums by American artists
Al Di Meola albums
1998 albums